Ferruccio Fazio (born 7 August 1944) is an Italian politician and was the minister of health from 2009 to 2011 in the fourth cabinet of Silvio Berlusconi.

Early life and education
Fazio was born in Garessio on 7 August 1944. He studied medicine.

Career
Fazio is a professor of diagnostic imaging and radiotherapy at University of Milan Bicocca. He was also the director of nuclear medicine and radiation oncology at Vita-Salute San Raffaele University in Milan.

He served as undersecretary for health until his appointment as vice minister of health on 21 May 2008. During his tenure as undersecretary, he was responsible for struggle against the bird flu. Then he served as the vice minister until his appointment as minister of health in December 2009. His tenure ended in November 2011, and Renato Balduzzi replaced him as health minister.

In May 2019 Fazio is elected mayor of Garessio.

Personal life
Fazio is married and has two children, a daughter and a son.

References

External links

20th-century Italian physicians
21st-century Italian physicians
1944 births
Government ministers of Italy
Independent politicians in Italy
Italian radiologists
Living people
Mayors of places in Italy
People from Garessio
Academic staff of the University of Milano-Bicocca
University of Pisa alumni